Sergei Vladimirovich Mandreko (1 August 1971 – 8 March 2022) was a Russian-Tajik football coach and player who played as a midfielder.

Club career
Mandreko was born in Kurgan-Tyube, Tajik SSR. After leaving the newly independent Tajikistan after the dissolution of the Soviet Union he spent the rest of his club career in Austria and Germany.

International career
Mandreko was capped at senior level by CIS, Russia and Tajikistan. With the Soviet Union national under-20 team Mandreko won the bronze medal at the FIFA World Youth Championship in 1991.

Coaching career
From 2008 until 2009 Mandreko worked as an assistant manager under Rashid Rakhimov during his time with FC Lokomotiv Moscow.

Personal life
Having suffered from amyotrophic lateral sclerosis since 2016, Mandreko died on 8 March 2022, at the age of 50.

References

External links
 
 
 
 
 Mandreko at rusteam.permian.ru 
 Career, statistics and goals

1971 births
2022 deaths
People from Khatlon Region
Soviet footballers
Russian footballers
Tajikistani footballers
Association football midfielders
Soviet Union international footballers
Tajikistan international footballers
Soviet Union under-21 international footballers
Russia under-21 international footballers
Russia international footballers
Dual internationalists (football)
SK Rapid Wien players
Hertha BSC players
VfL Bochum players
SV Mattersburg players
CSKA Pamir Dushanbe players
Soviet Top League players
Austrian Football Bundesliga players
Bundesliga players
2. Bundesliga players
Deaths from motor neuron disease
Tajikistani expatriate footballers
Russian expatriate footballers
Tajikistani expatriate sportspeople in Germany
Expatriate footballers in Germany
Tajikistani expatriate sportspeople in Austria
Expatriate footballers in Austria
Tajikistani football managers